Brian Goodman (born June 1, 1963, Boston, Massachusetts) is an American film director, television director, writer, and actor.

Career
Brian Goodman auditioned for, and received, a role in the low-budget film titled Southie with Donnie Wahlberg.

In 2008, Goodman co-wrote and directed the film What Doesn't Kill You. Goodman has also had recurring and guest-starring roles in a number of different films and television series, including all thirteen episodes of Line of Fire (as Donovan Stubbin) and three episodes of Lost as Ryan Pryce.

He also appeared in The Last Castle (2001), Catch Me If You Can (2002), The Fast and the Furious: Tokyo Drift (2006), and two episodes of 24. He was a main cast member in season 3 and 4 of Rizzoli & Isles.

Filmography

Film

Television

References

External links
 
 

American male film actors
American male television actors
Living people
People from South Boston
1963 births
Male actors from Boston
American television directors
Film directors from Massachusetts
20th-century American male actors
21st-century American male actors